The 1932 United States presidential election in Tennessee took place on November 8, 1932, as part of the 1932 United States presidential election. Tennessee voters chose 11 representatives, or electors, to the Electoral College, who voted for president and vice president.

Tennessee was won by Governor Franklin D. Roosevelt (D–New York), running with Speaker John Nance Garner, with 66.49% of the popular vote, against incumbent President Herbert Hoover (R–California), running with Vice President Charles Curtis, with 32.48% of the popular vote.

Results

Results by county

References

1932 Tennessee elections
Tennessee
1932